Greenidea is a genus of true bugs belonging to the family Aphididae.

The genus has cosmopolitan distribution.

Species:

Aphis longicornis 
Greenidea aborensis 
Greenidea anonae 
Greenidea artocarpi 
Greenidea ayyari 
Greenidea brachyunguis
Greenidea brideliae 
Greenidea bucktonis 
Greenidea camelliae
Greenidea carpini 
Greenidea carpinicola 
Greenidea castanopsidis 
Greenidea cayratiae 
Greenidea chiengmaiensis 
Greenidea decaspermi 
Greenidea eugeniae 
Greenidea fici 
Greenidea ficicola 
Greenidea flacourtiae 
Greenidea fulva 
Greenidea gigantea 
Greenidea haldari
Greenidea hangnigra 
Greenidea heterotricha
Greenidea himansui 
Greenidea hirsuta 
Greenidea hispanica 
Greenidea isensis 
Greenidea kheemothicola 
Greenidea kumaoni
Greenidea kunmingensis 
Greenidea kuwanai 
Greenidea longicornis 
Greenidea longirostris 
Greenidea longisetosa 
Greenidea macrostyla
Greenidea maculata 
Greenidea magna 
Greenidea mangiferae 
Greenidea manii 
Greenidea morloti
Greenidea mushana 
Greenidea myricae 
Greenidea nigra 
Greenidea nigricans 
Greenidea nipponica
Greenidea okajimai
Greenidea pallescens
Greenidea pallidipes 
Greenidea parthenocissi
Greenidea photiniphaga 
Greenidea prinicola 
Greenidea prunicola 
Greenidea psidii 
Greenidea quercicola 
Greenidea quercifoliae 
Greenidea querciphaga 
Greenidea rappardi 
Greenidea shimae 
Greenidea siamensis
Greenidea sikkimensis 
Greenidea sinensis 
Greenidea spinotibium 
Greenidea sutepensis
Greenidea symplocosis 
Greenidea viticola

References

Aphididae